Bethlehem High School may refer to:

Canada
 Bethlehem High School (Saskatoon)

United States
 Bethlehem High School (Bonifay, Florida), see Holmes District School Board
 Bethlehem High School (Kentucky), Bardstown, Kentucky
 Bethlehem Central High School, Delmar, New York